Defined narrowly, a game stalker is a sport hunter who approaches close to a timid quarry before making a kill. The practice is commonly associated with the moors of Scotland where the principal quarry is red deer. However, the skill is found worldwide and is of extremely long-standing. Many other predator animals such as cats and hyenas also stalk their prey.

Among hunter-gatherers, where their prey is typically timid, stalking is a way of livelihood in order that they may catch what they hunt. Nowadays, stalking is frequently done for purposes of photography or observation of animal behavior rather than for killing.

Whatever the means of killing, the hunter is required to get near the quarry in order to achieve it. Most animals are very sensitive to the presence of predators and will escape when perceiving threats within the flight zone. In many cases, the animal's sense of smell is highly developed and can detect anything with an unusual scent, therefore the stalker therefore needs to approach from downwind.  Similarly, cryptic care needs to be taken to avoid being seen and heard.

The deerstalker is a type of hat associated with Sherlock Holmes and Elmer Fudd. Notable for its slight rain-brim to the front and back, with a camouflage checked twill pattern and fold-down earpieces for selective warmth or to raise when listening for deer.

See also
Deer stalking

Hunters